Groton Township is one of the nine townships of Erie County, Ohio, United States. It is part of the Sandusky, Ohio metropolitan statistical area. As of the 2010 census the population was 1,427.

Geography
Located in the southwestern corner of the county, it borders the following townships:
Margaretta Township - north
Perkins Township - northeast corner
Oxford Township - east
Ridgefield Township, Huron County - southeast corner
Lyme Township, Huron County - south
York Township, Sandusky County - west
Townsend Township, Sandusky County - northwest

A small corner of the city of Bellevue is located in southwestern Groton Township.

Name and history
It is the only Groton Township statewide.

Government
The township is governed by a three-member board of trustees, who are elected in November of odd-numbered years to a four-year term beginning on the following January 1. Two are elected in the year after the presidential election and one is elected in the year before it. There is also an elected township fiscal officer, who serves a four-year term beginning on April 1 of the year after the election, which is held in November of the year before the presidential election. Vacancies in the fiscal officership or on the board of trustees are filled by the remaining trustees.

References

External links
County website

Townships in Erie County, Ohio
Townships in Ohio